The Sumathi Best Television Musical Program Award is presented annually in Sri Lanka by the Sumathi Group  for the best Sri Lankan television musical program.

The award was first given in 1995. Following is a list of the winners since then.

References

Sumathi Awards